Denis Edward Browne, 10th Marquess of Sligo (13 December 1908 – 11 September 1991), known as Denis Browne until 1952, was an Irish peer.

Life
Browne was the son of Captain Lord Alfred Eden Browne, the fifth son of Henry Browne, 5th Marquess of Sligo. His mother was Cicely Wormald, daughter of Edward Wormald. In 1952 he succeeded his uncle in the marquessate.

Lord Sligo married Jose Gauche, daughter of William Gauche, in 1930. In 1982 his book Westport House and the Brownes was published. He died in September 1991, aged 82, and was succeeded by his son, Jeremy Browne, 11th Marquess of Sligo.

References

External links

1908 births
1991 deaths
People from County Mayo
Denis
Denis
Earls of Clanricarde